Stupid Bom (Swedish: Dumbom) is a 1953 Swedish comedy film directed by Nils Poppe and starring Poppe, Inga Landgré,  Hjördis Petterson  and Ulf Johansson. It was shot at the Centrumateljéerna Sudios in Stockholm. The film's sets were designed by the art director Nils Nilsson. It was part of a series of films featuring Poppe as Fabian Bom.

Synopsis
Fabian Bom is mayor of a town which he has reformed through efficiency projects. Confusions arises when his long-lost twin brother arrives in town as the clown of a travelling circus.

Cast
 Nils Poppe as 	Fabian Bom / Dumbom
 Inga Landgré as 	Camilla
 Hjördis Petterson as 	Fru Holmström
 Ulf Johansson as 	Nilsson
 Dagmar Ebbesen as 	Fru Marinetti-Bock
 Arne Lindblad as Emanuel Bock
 Torsten Lilliecrona as Beppo
 Gunnar Olsson as 	Julius, trädgårdsmästaren
 Elsa Ebbesen as 	Ester
 Dagmar Olsson as 	Fröken Olofsson
 Bibi Andersson as 	Elvira 
 Marianne Gyllenhammar as 	Komiska damen på cirkusen
 Ludde Juberg as 	Vaktmästare i stadshuset
 Ragnar Klange as 	Överkonstapeln
 Rune Ottoson as 	Olsson, tjänsteman
 Sven Melin as 	Svensson, tjänsteman
 Göthe Grefbo as Pettersson, stadsrevisor
 Mille Schmidt as 	Fabian Boms chaufför
 Ingrid Jellart as 	Camilla som barn
 Bo Gustafsson as 	Fabian som barn
 Bengt Gustafsson as Dumbom som barn

References

Bibliography 
 Qvist, Per Olov & von Bagh, Peter. Guide to the Cinema of Sweden and Finland. Greenwood Publishing Group, 2000.

External links 
 

1953 films
Swedish comedy films
1953 comedy films
1950s Swedish-language films
Films directed by Nils Poppe
Swedish sequel films
1950s Swedish films